The following are the national records in athletics in Afghanistan maintained by the Afghanistan Athletic Federation.

Outdoor

Key to tables:

+ = en route to a longer distance

h = hand timing

NWI = no wind information

Men

Women

Indoor

Men

Women

Notes

References
General
World Athletics Statistic Handbook 2019: National Outdoor Records
World Athletics Statistic Handbook 2018: National Indoor Records
Specific

Afghan
Records
Athletics
Athletics